Municipal elections were held on 21 March 2018 in 335 municipalities in the Netherlands. This election determined the composition of the municipal councils for the following four years. The election coincided with the Intelligence and Security Services Act referendum.

Background

In the previous municipal elections, local political parties won by far most votes and seats. Nationally, all local political parties won 28% of the votes and a third of municipal council seats. Local parties have seen a steady rise since the 1990s. In 2018, Vlieland will be the only municipality in which no national political parties will contest the election.

Of all national political parties, the Christian Democratic Appeal (CDA) will contest most municipal elections; the party will be on the ballot in all but three (Rozendaal, Vlieland and Schiermonnikoog). The Labour Party (PvdA) comes second, contesting over 320 elections, albeit on a joint list with allied parties in some municipalities. The People's Party for Freedom and Democracy (VVD) will participate in over 315 elections, and the Democrats 66 in over 270, followed by GroenLinks in 220, the Christian Union in 169, the Socialist Party in 118 and the Reformed Political Party (SGP) in 99.

The Party for Freedom (PVV), which had previously only participated in The Hague and Almere, initially planned to expand to a total of sixty municipalities, but has only been able to find suitable candidates in thirty, including Rotterdam. 50PLUS will expand to twenty municipalities, while the Party for the Animals (PvdD) will contest fifteen elections. Two new national political parties will make their entrance to municipal politics. Denk will contest the elections in fourteen municipalities, while the Forum for Democracy will only contest in Amsterdam. Additionally, the latter has endorsed the local party Livable Rotterdam.

45 municipalities did not have elections on 21 March due to mergers.

Electoral system
Municipal councils are elected using party-list proportional representation. The number of seats depends on the population of the municipality, ranging from nine seats for municipalities with a population below 3,000, to 45 seats for municipalities with a population over 200,000.

Overall Results

Amsterdam

Opinion polling

Results

After the 2018 municipal elections, the GroenLinks held the largest share of seats on the municipal council, though not enough to hold a majority. As no party held a majority, a left-leaning governing coalition was formed between GroenLinks, D66, the Labour Party, and the Socialist Party, which together hold 26 of the city's 45 council seats. 

The new city council elected Femke Halsema, a member of the GroenLinks, to be the mayor of Amsterdam. Halsema is the first women to be elected mayor of Amsterdam, as well as the first member of the GroenLinks to take that position.

Rotterdam

Opinion polling

Results

The Hague

Opinion polling

Results

Utrecht

Opinion polling

Results

Eindhoven

Results

Nijmegen

Opinion polling

Results

References

External links
 

2018 elections in the Netherlands
2018
March 2018 events in the Netherlands